Crafty Hands is an album by the progressive rock band Happy the Man, released in 1978. Only one track, "Wind Up Doll Day Wind," contains vocals.

Reception
{{Album ratings
| rev1 = Allmusic
| rev1Score = <ref>{{cite web | url=https://www.allmusic.com/album/crafty-hands-mw0000051277 | title=Crafty Hands | work=Allmusic | accessdate=2019-02-23}}</ref>
}}
Mike McLatchey of Exposé Online stated that the album displays "some of the best, most elaborate and sophisticated symphonic rock ever produced, played by technical geniuses," but noted that, in comparison with the group's debut album, "Crafty Hands seems more polished, yet overall slightly less impressive."

Pete Pardo, writing for Sea of Tranquility, commented: "As far as US prog goes, it doesn't get much better than this folks. Crafty Hands'' is classy stuff all the way."

Track listing
"Service with a Smile" (Ron Riddle, Greg Hawkes) – 2:44
"Morning Sun" (Kit Watkins)  – 4:05
"Ibby It Is" (Frank Wyatt) – 7:50
"Steaming Pipes" (Stanley Whitaker) – 5:30
"Wind Up Doll Day Wind" (Watkins, Whitaker, Wyatt) – 7:06
"Open Book" (Wyatt) – 4:53
"I Forgot to Push It" (Watkins) – 3:08
"The Moon, I Sing (Nossuri)" (Watkins) – 6:16

Personnel
Stanley Whitaker - six and twelve string guitars, vocals (5)
Frank Wyatt - pianos, harpsichord, saxes, flute, words
Kit Watkins - pianos, harpsichord, Moog synthesizer, fake strings, clavinet, 33, recorder
Rick Kennell - bass
Ron Riddle - drums, percussion

References

1978 albums
Albums produced by Ken Scott
Arista Records albums
Happy the Man albums